The 1946 Ancash earthquake in the Andes Mountains of central Peru occurred on November 10 at 17:43 UTC. The earthquake had a surface-wave magnitude of 7.0, and achieved a maximum Mercalli intensity scale rating of XI (Extreme). About 1,400 Peruvians are thought to have died from the event.

Tectonic setting
The west coast of Peru lies a convergent boundary where the Nazca Plate subducts beneath the South American Plate. Despite being located in a zone of compression, shallow continental extension occur beneath the Andes mountains, within the overriding South American Plate. Some of these normal faults are dated to the Quaternary and are considered young. The 1946 event is the only recorded normal faulting earthquake within the Andes mountains.

Earthquake
The earthquake was triggered by slippage along a shallow-angle normal fault at a depth of ~, as suggested by the focal mechanism. A surface-wave magnitude of 7.0 was assigned by the ISC while the calculated moment magnitude was 7.0 ± 0.1 or 6.8. Surface rupture associated with the earthquake was the first on a large-scale ever observed in South America. This event also reactivated several older thrust faults. These faults are part of the Marańón fold and thrust belt, which formed in the Tertiary. Shallow intraplate earthquakes within the South American Plate are rare due to the long recurrence intervals on faults. The Quiches Fault have an average recurrence interval of 13,000 years.

Impact
Shaking was felt over a  area. It was most severe in the departments of Ancash and La Libertad. At least 45 landslides were triggered by the strong ground motions which was the reason for the high death toll and destruction. One of these slides completely buried the village of Acobamba in Suytucocha Valley. At least 217 people died in Acobamba.

The earthquake was felt over a  area. Shaking was reportedly so strong that residents in the village of Mayas were unable to stand. The maximum Modified Mercalli intensity, X–XI, was felt from Cerro Pelagatos to the villages of Mayas and Quiches. Large landslides were reported within the isoseismal VIII–IX. Many fatalities were the result of poor construction practices. Villages experienced amplified shaking on soft alluvial deposits. In the village of Quiches, 677 people were killed. Hundreds of deaths were recorded in Acobamba, Sihuas, Conchucos and Pampas.

See also
List of earthquakes in Peru
List of earthquakes in 1946

References

External links

1946 earthquakes
Earthquakes in Peru
1946 in Peru
History of La Libertad Region
Ancash Region
Landslides in Peru
November 1946 events in South America
1946 disasters in Peru